Szymon is a Polish version of the masculine given name Simon.

Academics
Szymon Askenazy – a historian and diplomat who served as the first Polish representative at the League of Nations
Szymon Datner – a Polish-Jewish historian and anti-Nazi partisan fighter

Artists
Szymon Bobrowski – an actor
Szymon Buchbinder – a 19th and early 20th century Polish painter
Szymon Czechowicz – an 18th-century Polish painter
Szymon Goldberg – a Polish-American violinist and conductor
Szymon Szymonowic – a Polish Renaissance poet
Szymon Josiah Borzestowski - an Australian musician

Athletes
Szymon Matuszek – a Polish footballer (midfielder)
Szymon Pawlak – a Polish footballer (defender)
Szymon Szewczyk – a Polish professional basketball player
Szymon Ziółkowski – an Olympic gold medal-winning hammer thrower

Nobility
Szymon Marcin Kossakowski – an 18th-century Polish Lithuanian nobleman and a leader of the Targowica Confederation
Szymon Samuel Sanguszko – a 17th-century nobleman of the Polish–Lithuanian Commonwealth
Szymon Starowolski – a 17th-century Lithuanian writer and scholar
Szymon Bogumił Zug – an 18th-century Polish nobleman and architect

Politicians
Szymon Konarski – a 19th-century Polish democrat and revolutionary
Szymon Stanisław Giżyński – a member of Poland's lower house of parliament (the Sejm) from Law and Justice
Szymon Pawłowski (politician) – a member of Poland's lower house of parliament (the Sejm) from League of Polish Families
Szymon Perske – the birth name of former Israeli Prime Minister Shimon Peres
Szymon Niemiec – a vice president of Polish party Union of the Left, gay activist and founder of first Polish Gay Pride parade

Others
Szymon Winawer – a chess player

Polish masculine given names